Mohammad Rauf Mehdi ( born: June 14, 1958 in Kabul) also known as Mehdizadeh Kabuli  is an Afghan historian, writer and the director of the Aryana encyclopedia. He was an elected delegate to the Loya Jirga 2002 and the Constitutional Loya Jirga 2003 (He sat on the third of the Jirga's ten committees).

Early life 
Mohammad Rauf Mehdi was born on 14 June 1958 in Kabul and educated at AIT (Afghan Institute Technology), and a top graduate of the Kabul University (Faculty of Engineering). In 1981, he obtained his B.S. in civil engineering. In the same year, he started teaching at Kabul University. In 1984, he protested against the military occupation of Afghanistan by the Soviet Red Army and was forced to leave Afghanistan. He lived in Iran for 20 years (from 1984 to 2004) and in the different parts of the administration and management of construction projects in Iran was engaged.

Research works 
 Introduction to Afghanistan history
 Prehistoric Afghanistan
 Afghanistan is the cradle of Zoroastrianism
 The Big Lie (naked face of Islam)

References 

1958 births
20th-century Afghan historians
21st-century Afghan historians
People from Kabul
Living people